This is a list of countries that regulate the immigration of felons.

Australia excludes any person who has been sentenced to a term of imprisonment for 12 months or more.
Canada excludes any person who has committed a non-summary offence,  unless, after waiting until five years have elapsed since the  expiration of any sentence imposed for the offence, they satisfy the Canadian Minister of Immigration  that they are rehabilitated.
China excludes any person who has terrorism, deportation, smuggling, drug trafficking, prostitution or other felony convictions.
Japan excludes any person who has been sentenced to a term of imprisonment for 12 months or more.
New Zealand excludes:
 any person who, at any time, was convicted and sentenced to imprisonment for 5 years or more, or an indeterminable period is capable of running for 5 years or more, and
 any person who, in the past 10 years, was convicted and sentenced to imprisonment for 12 months or more.
Russia excludes any person in the past 10 years who has been sentenced to a term of imprisonment for 12 months or more.
South Korea has zero tolerance policy for those with felony convictions and require criminal record background check certificate for those with misdemeanor convictions.
The United Kingdom's Immigration Rules mandate exclusion of any person who has been sentenced to 4 years or more in prison for a single offence; or has been convicted of an offence for which they have been sentenced to a period of imprisonment of at least 12 months but less than 4 years, unless a period of 10 years has passed since the end of the sentence; or has been convicted of an offence for which they have been sentenced to a period of imprisonment of less than 12 months, unless a period of 5 years has passed since the end of the sentence. There are limited exceptions where a refusal of entry would breach the Human Rights Convention or the Convention and Protocol Relating to the Status of Refugees, but otherwise it will only be in exceptional circumstances that the public interest in maintaining entry refusal will be outweighed by compelling factors.
The United States does not allow aliens convicted of aggravated felonies to become citizens. See also Permanent residence (United States).

See also
 UK immigration enforcement
 Non-visa travel restrictions

References

 Felons

Crime-related lists
Immigration-related lists